The following article presents a summary of the 1993 football (soccer) season in Brazil, which was the 92nd season of competitive football in the country.

Campeonato Brasileiro Série A

Second phase

Final

Palmeiras declared as the Campeonato Brasileiro champions by aggregate score of 3–0.

Relegation
The four worst placed teams in each one of the groups C and D in the first stage, which are Ceará, Santa Cruz, Goiás, Fortaleza, América-MG, Coritiba, Atlético Paranaense and Desportiva, were relegated to the following year's second level.

Copa do Brasil

The Copa do Brasil final was played between Cruzeiro and Grêmio.

Cruzeiro declared as the cup champions by aggregate score of 2–1.

State championship champions

Youth competition champions

Other competition champions

Brazilian clubs in international competitions

Brazil national team
The following table lists all the games played by the Brazil national football team in official competitions and friendly matches during 1993.

Women's football

National team
The Brazil women's national football team did not play any matches in 1993.

References

 Brazilian competitions at RSSSF
 1993 Brazil national team matches at RSSSF
 1986-1996 Brazil women's national team matches at RSSSF

 
Seasons in Brazilian football
Brazil